Live on Earth may refer to:
 Live on Earth (Cat Empire album)
 Live... on Earth, a 2000 album by Krishna Das
 Live on Earth (Star One album)
 Live on Earth (UFO album)

See also
 Living on Earth, an American radio news program
 Life on Earth (disambiguation)
 Live Earth, an event to increase environmental awareness through entertainment